The Gilgai Stakes, registered as the Baguette Stakes, is a Victoria Racing Club Group 2 Thoroughbred horse race for horses three years old and older, at Set Weights with penalties, over a distance of 1200 metres. It is held annually at Flemington Racecourse, Melbourne, Australia in early October. Total prize money for the race is A$300,000.

History
Originally the race was named after the former VRC chairman Sir Rupert Steele. The registered name of the race, Baguette Stakes, is named after the champion horse Baguette. The current race name is named after Gilgai Farm Stud, a horse breeding farm in Nagambie, Victoria, the birthplace of the champion racehorse Black Caviar.

Name
 1984–1998 - Sir Rupert Steele Stakes
 1999 - Gilgai Farm Stakes
 2000 onwards  - Gilgai Stakes

Grade
 1984–1986 - Listed Race
 1987–2006 - Group 3
 2007 onwards - Group 2

Winners

 2022 - Private Eye
 2021 - Kementari
 2020 - Zoutori
 2019 - Sunlight
 2018 - I Am Excited
 2017 - Keen Array
 2016 - The Quarterback
 2015 - Chautauqua
 2014 - Chautauqua
 2013 - Platelet
 2012 - Hallowell Belle
 2011 - Temple Of Boom
 2010 - Hay List
 2009 - All Silent
 2008 - El Cambio
 2007 - Stanzout
 2006 - Fast N Famous
 2005 - Falkirk
 2004 - Recapitalize
 2003 - Bomber Bill
 2002 - Cosmic Strike
 2001 - Belle Du Jour
 2000 - Bomber Bill
 1999 - Black Bean
 1998 - Rebel
 1997 - Rock You
 1996 - Poetic King
 1995 - Racer's Edge
 1994 - Hareeba
 1993 - Simonstad
 1992 - Storaia
 1991 - Vain Sovereign
 1990 - Joanne
 1989 - Grandiose
 1988 - Redelva
 1987 - Placid Ark
 1986 - Campaign King
 1985 - Rich Fields Lad
 1984 - Royal Troubador

See also
 List of Australian Group races
 Group races

References

Horse races in Australia